A disc galaxy (or disk galaxy) is a galaxy characterized by a galactic disc, a flattened circular volume of stars. These galaxies may or may not include a central non-disc-like region (a galactic bulge).

Disc galaxy types include:
 Spiral galaxies:
 Unbarred spiral galaxies: (types S, SA)
 Barred spiral galaxies: (type SB)
 Intermediate spiral galaxies: (type SAB)
 Lenticular galaxies: (types E8, S0, SA0, SB0, SAB0)

Galaxies that are not disc types include:
 Elliptical galaxies: (type dE)
 Irregular galaxies: (type dI)

See also 

 thick disk
 thin disk

References

Galaxy morphological types